The Hunger for More is the debut studio album by American rapper Lloyd Banks, released via Interscope Records and 50 Cent's G-Unit Records. Originally scheduled for a May 25, 2004 release, the album was ultimately released on June 29, 2004 as later planned.

Background
The hit singles from this album include "On Fire", "I'm So Fly", and "Karma". The album version of "Karma" uses vocals by Kevin Cossom while the single remix version features Avant. Feature appearances on this album include 50 Cent, Tony Yayo, Young Buck, Eminem, Snoop Dogg, Nate Dogg, and the Game.

During the first week of The Hunger For More'''s release, a distribution house in Manhattan was robbed of approximately eight boxes of the CDs (200 copies). A New York record store had nearly 100 copies of the CD stolen from its racks by a single perpetrator on the album's first day in stores, though they were later recovered.

Concept
During an interview Lloyd Banks explained the reason behind naming the album. He said: 

Recordings

Reception
Critical response

Upon its release, The Hunger for More received positive reviews from most music critics. At Metacritic, which assigns a normalized rating out of 100 to reviews from mainstream critics, the album received an average score of 66, based on 10 reviews, which indicates "generally favorable reviews".

Commercial performance
The album debuted and peaked at number 1 on the Billboard 200 chart, with week-one sales topping 433,000. The album remained at #1 on the Billboard 200 in the 2nd week, selling close to 164,000 copies in the United States. "That's the kind of debut that veteran artists have," says Banks. "That showed me that following 50's moves and studying the way that he played the game had put me in an incredible position." The album has since been certified Platinum by the RIAA.Searchable Database . RIAA. Accessed July 31, 2007. The album also achieved Platinum status in Canada. The album has sold over 1,500,000 copies in the United States and over 3,250,000 worldwide.

Track listing

Special edition
The album was also released in a special edition, which featured a bonus track and different packaging (including a CD booklet on dollar bill-style paper). It also included a 25-minute DVD with the video for "My Buddy", a clip for "Smile" and "A Day in the Life of Lloyd Banks."
The Bonus Track on the Special Edition, "Just Another Day", contains lyrical interpolations of Queen Latifah's song of the same name.

Charts

Weekly charts

Year-end charts

Certifications

References

External links
 Review of The Hunger for More from USA Today''

Lloyd Banks albums
2004 debut albums
Albums produced by Danja (record producer)
Albums produced by Timbaland
Albums produced by Eminem
Albums produced by Hi-Tek
Albums produced by Ron Browz
Albums produced by Scram Jones
G-Unit Records albums